The 2017–18 Georgia Lady Bulldogs women's basketball team represented University of Georgia in the 2017–18 NCAA Division I women's basketball season. The Lady Bulldogs, led by third-year head coach Joni Taylor, played their home games at Stegeman Coliseum as members of the Southeastern Conference. They finished the season 26–7, 12–4 in SEC play to finish in a tie for second place. They advanced to the semifinals of the SEC women's tournament where they lost to South Carolina. They received an at-large bid to the NCAA women's tournament where they defeated Mercer in the first round before losing to Duke in the second round.

Roster

Schedule

|-
! colspan="12" style="background:#000; color:#a0000b;"| Non-conference regular season

|-
! colspan="12" style="background:#000; color:#a0000b;"| SEC regular season

|-
!colspan="12" style="background:#000; color:#a0000b;"| SEC Women's Tournament

|-
!colspan="12" style="background:#000; color:#a0000b;"| NCAA Women's Tournament

Source:

Rankings

^Coaches' Poll did not release a second poll at the same time as the AP.

See also
 2017–18 Georgia Bulldogs basketball team

References

Georgia Lady Bulldogs basketball seasons
Georgia
Georgia
Bulldogs
Bulldogs